The women's discus throw at the 1962 British Empire and Commonwealth Games as part of the athletics programme was held at the Perry Lakes Stadium on Saturday 1 December 1962.

The event was won by New Zealander Valerie Young who earlier won the shot put title. Young won by  ahead of the Australian pairing of Rosslyn Williams and Mary McDonald and the defending champion, Englishwoman Suzanne Allday who finished in fourth. Williams and McDonald also bettered the mark.

Records

Final

References

Women's discus throw
1962